The Jenkins House is a historic home in Bastrop, Texas. It was built about 1836 for Sarah Jenkins. Her first husband was killed by Indians. Her second was killed at the Battle of the Alamo.

The Jenkins House started as a single-room log cabin and then was enlarged to a two-room log cabin with a "dog-trot" between rooms. A kitchen and dining "ell" was added in subsequent years, and finally, the dog-trot opening was enclosed as a hall, the house sided with clapboard, and a porch running the length of the building added to create its present Victorian appearance. The house was designated a Recorded Texas Historic Landmark in 1964. It was listed on the National Register of Historic Places on December 22, 1978.

See also

National Register of Historic Places listings in Bastrop County, Texas
Recorded Texas Historic Landmarks in Bastrop County

References

Houses in Bastrop County, Texas
Houses on the National Register of Historic Places in Texas
National Register of Historic Places in Bastrop County, Texas
Recorded Texas Historic Landmarks
Dogtrot architecture
Houses completed in 1880